John Augur Holabird (1886–1945) was an American architect based in Chicago.

Biography
John Augur Holabird was born in Evanston, Illinois on May 4, 1886, the son of architect William Holabird. He was educated at The Hill School, then trained as an engineer, graduating from the U.S. Military Academy at West Point in 1907, with further study at the Washington Barracks Engineering School in 1909.

By 1913, he had completed study at Paris' École des Beaux-Arts, where he became friends with John Wellborn Root, Jr., the son of another famous Chicago architect. Holabird's father had formed the architectural firm Holabird & Roche in Chicago in 1883, and the younger Holabird joined the firm in 1914. Following the deaths of William Holabird and Martin Roche in the late 1920s, John Holabird and John Wellborn Root, Jr., who had also joined the firm in 1914, became the named partners of Holabird & Root.

The firm became known for buildings in the Art Deco style, particularly Chicago skyscrapers, including 333 North Michigan Avenue, the Palmolive Building, the Chicago Daily News Building, the Chicago Board of Trade, and the Henry Crown Field House.  They also designed the North Dakota State Capitol building, among others.

The firm weathered the Great Depression and is still active. Holabird died at St. Luke's Hospital in Chicago on May 4, 1945, just as victory was declared in Europe for World War II. His nephew, Bill Holabird, was named a partner in the firm in 1945, and John A. Holabird, Jr., became a partner in 1970.

Membership

Holabird was a member of the Chicago Planning Commission, a trustee of the Art Institute of Chicago, and a designer of the Century of Progress Exposition in Chicago (1933–34). Holabird served on the U.S. Commission of Fine Arts from 1976 to 1980.  The Chicago History Museum houses collections of both Holabird & Roche and Holabird & Root. In 1937, Holabird was elected into the National Academy of Design as an Associate member and became a full Academician in 1944.

Significant buildings
Palmolive Building, 1929
333 North Michigan Building, 1928
Chicago Board of Trade Building, 1930
Chicago Daily News Building, 1929
Chrysler Building at the Century of Progress 1933–34 World's Fair
Evanston Masonic Temple, Evanston Illinois

Sources
 Bruegmann, Robert. Holabird & Roche/Holabird & Root: An Illustrated Catalog of Works, 1880–1940.  New York: Garland Publishing, 1991.

References

External links
Holabird & Root's current website
Holabird & Root Encyclopedia of Chicago entry

1886 births
1963 deaths
Artists from Chicago
Art Deco architects
20th-century American architects
American alumni of the École des Beaux-Arts
The Hill School alumni
Holabird & Root
Burials at Graceland Cemetery (Chicago)
United States Military Academy alumni